Small Cajal body-specific RNA 5 is a protein that in humans is encoded by the SCARNA5 gene.

References

Further reading